The Eildon Pondage Power Station is a hydroelectric power station on the Eildon Pondage at Lake Eildon, Victoria, Australia. It is owned and operated by Pacific Hydro, and the electricity produced is sold to electricity retailer TXU.

Eildon Pondage re-uses the water from Eildon Power Station, which is stored in the pondage to ensure a controlled release into the Goulburn River downstream from Lake Eildon.

See also

 List of power stations in Victoria (Australia)
 Eildon Hydroelectric Power Station

References

Energy infrastructure completed in 1995
Hydroelectric power stations in Victoria (Australia)